The Komi language (komi kyv), also known as Zyryan, Zyrian or Komi-Zyryan (Komi: коми-зыран кыв, komi-zyran kyv), is one of the two regional varieties of the pluricentric Komi language, the other regional variety being Permyak. 

Komi is natively spoken by the Komi peoples native to the Komi Republic and other parts of Russia such as Nenetsia and Yamalia. There were 285,000 speakers in 1994, which decreased to 160,000 in 2010. Komi has a standardized form.

It was written in the Old Permic alphabet (Komi: , Анбур, Anbur) for liturgical purposes in the 14th century. The Cyrillic script was introduced by Russia missionaries in the 17th century, replacing the Old Permic script. A tradition of secular works of literature in the modern form of the language dates back to the 19th century.

Dialects
Komi has ten dialects: Prisyktyvkarsky, Lower Vychegdan, Central Vychegdan, Luzsko-letsky, Upper Sysolan, Upper Vychegdan, Pechoran, Izhemsky, Vymsky, and Udorsky. Prisyktyvkarsky is spoken in the region of Syktyvkar and forms the model for the generic standard dialect of the language.
 Older * remains unchanged in upper Vychegdan and Pechoran dialects (also in most dialects of Komi-Permyak).
 In Central dialects,  changed to  syllable-finally; for instance, in literary Komi * →  "tongue".
 In Northern dialects, changes of  continued with complete vocalization of syllable-final , resulting in long vowels.

The start of the change date to the 17th century. It is not seen in the oldest Komi texts from the 14th century, nor in loanwords from Komi to Khanty, dated to the 16th; though it fully occurred before Russian loanwords that entered the language in the 18th century as  remains unchanged in these. 

Some dialects are further distinguished based on the palatalized alveolars , which have unpacked in syllable-final position as clusters .

Writing system

 

The Old Permic script is the first writing system for Komi. It was invented in the 14th century by the missionary Stepan Khrap. The alphabet resembled medieval Greek and Cyrillic. The script was also known as Anbur (Komi: , Анбур), named for the first 2 letters of the script, “an” & “bur” (𐍐 & 𐍑, respectively). It is no longer in use today, though it has received Unicode Support as “Old Permic” in recent times. The script saw use in Komi-inhabited areas, primarily the Principality of Great Perm and parts of Bjarmaland.

In the 16th century, this alphabet was replaced by the Russian alphabet with certain modifications for affricates. In the 1920s the language was written in the Molodtsov alphabet, which also derived from Cyrillic. In the 1930s, during the Latinisation in the Soviet Union, Komi was briefly written with a version of the Latin script. Since the 1940s it uses the Russian-based Cyrillic alphabet with additional letters І, і and Ӧ, ӧ.

Letters particular to the Molodtsov alphabet include ԁ, ԃ, ԅ, ԇ, ԉ, ԋ, ԍ, ԏ, most of which represent palatalized consonants.

Phonology

Consonants

Vowels

Grammar 

Komi has 17 cases, with a rich inventory of locative cases. Like other Uralic languages, Komi has no gender. Verbs agree with subjects in person and number (sg/pl). Negation is expressed with an auxiliary verb, which is inflected for person, number and tense.

Komi is an agglutinative language and adheres to a subject–object–verb order.

Sample text

The following sample text displays the Anbur, Cyrillic (modern) and Latin lyrical text from the Komi-Zyryan folk song “Kačaśinjas” (Daisies). 

The first verse of the song and the refrain, as written in the Anbur Script:

The second verse and refrain, as written in the Zyran Cyrillic Alphabet: 
Эмöсь лунвылын мичаджык муяс,  Сэнi кывтöны визувджык юяс.  Сöмын мыйлакö пыр медся матыс   Эзысь лысваöн дзирдалысь асыв.  Катшасинъяс,   Катшасинъяс,  Мыйла восьсаöсь пыр тiян синъяс?

The third and final verse and refrain, as written in the modern Latin Alphabet:
Una śylankyv tatyś mi kyvlim,  Kodös śiöny raďejtan nyvly.  Lovja dźoridźyś myj burys śurö   Syly puktyny kudria jurö.  Kačaśinjas,   Kačaśinjas,  Myjla vośsaöś pyr tijan śinjas?

Notes

Bibliography 

 
Abondolo, Daniel (2015). The Uralic Languages. Routledge
R. M. Batalova. 1993. Komi(-Zyryanskij) Jazyk. In V. N. Jartseva (ed.), Jazyki Mira: Ural'skie Jazyki, 214–229. Moskva: Nauka.
 Feďuňova, G.V. Önija komi kyv ('The Modern Komi Language'). Morfologija/Daśtöma filologijasa kandidat G.V.Feďuňova kipod ulyn. Syktyvkar: Komi ňebög ledźanin, 2000. 544 pp. .

External links

 Books in Komi-Zyrian from Finno-Ugric Electronic Library (by the Finno-Ugric Information Center in Syktyvkar, Komi Republic (interface in Russian and English, texts in Mari, Komi, Udmurt, Erzya and Moksha languages))
 Komi–Russian & Russian–Komi Online Dictionaries
 Tarabukin I.I. Komi–Russian Phraseological Dictionary.
 Komi Grammar. (in Russian)
 Komi-language courses
 Books in Komi-Zyrian language (by the Finno-Ugric Information Center in Syktyvkar, Komi Republic (interface in Komi-Zyrian))
 Books in Komi-Permyak language (by the Finno-Ugric Information Center in Syktyvkar, Komi Republic (interface in Komi-Permyak))
 Komi media collection (by the Finno-Ugric Information Center in Syktyvkar, Komi Republic (interface in English))

 
Komi
Languages of Russia
Komi Republic